John Fox (4 July 1929 – 25 May 2017) was a South African cricketer. He played in eighteen first-class matches from 1954/55 to 1963/64.

References

External links
 

1929 births
2017 deaths
South African cricketers
Eastern Province cricketers
Free State cricketers
Western Province cricketers
Cricketers from Durban